John Irvine Hunter (24 January 1898 – 10 December 1924) was an Australian professor of anatomy.

Early life and education
Hunter was born in Bendigo, Victoria, the third son of Henry Hunter, a furniture dealer, and Isabella née Hodgson. At eight years of age, Hunter contracted pneumonia and was sent to recuperate with an aunt in Albury, New South Wales, where he stayed for some years afterwards.

Hunter was educated first at Albury Public school (1906–12), and later at the academically selective Fort Street High School, Sydney, which he left with a bursary and an exhibition. As a medical student at the University of Sydney, despite circumstances making it necessary for him to earn money by coaching, he succeeded in winning practically all available prizes and scholarships. Hunter graduated with first-class honours in 1920. From 1917 to 1920, Hunter was a medical tutor at Wesley College, University of Sydney, and, from 1918 to 1920, he was a demonstrator in anatomy.

Career and later life
During World War I, Hunter enlisted for active service in 1917. He entered into camp, but in his absence his achievements had been recognized both by his fellow students and his teachers, resulting in Hunter being officially ordered to return to his studies.

Professorship
In 1920, Professor Wilson, who had taken great interest in Hunter, resigned the Challis Professorship of Anatomy at Sydney, to become Regius Professor of Anatomy at the University of Cambridge. On his suggestion in July 1920, Hunter, aged 22, was appointed Associate Professor of Anatomy. About 12 months later, he left for Europe to pursue his studies further, and, for a year, he acted as an honorary lecturer at Cambridge. Before he had left Australia, Hunter had done "three important researches in utterly different fields of embryology, anthropology, and physiology. Hunter cleared up many of the difficulties in the interpretation of ovarian pregnancy, in the real significance of the occurrence of neanderthaloid characters in aboriginal Australians, and in analyzing the complicated factors of spinal shock following transverse section of the spinal cord". At Cambridge, Hunter became familiar with the methods of leading anatomical schools in Europe and made valuable contributions to the solution of problems raised by the Piltdown skull and Rhodesian remains in the British Museum.

Hunter returned to Australia by way of the United States and Canada, where he stayed long enough to give some lectures. The Challis Professorship of Anatomy had, in the meantime, been kept open for him, and he was appointed to that position in December 1922, a few weeks before he reached the age of 25.

Later career
Before leaving Sydney, Hunter had been much interested in the physiological research of Dr. N. D. Royle, and upon his return they researched together. In October 1923, a demonstration of the result of their work was given in the lecture theatre of the department of anatomy, Sydney. On 7 May 1924, the University of Sydney conferred the degree of Doctor of Medicine with First-Class Honours on Hunter, and he also received the University Medal and the Ethel Talbot Prize. In March Dr. William J. Mayo and other representatives of the American College of Surgeons visited Australia, and were so impressed with the work of Drs. Royle and Hunter that they invited them to deliver the Dr. John B. Murphy oration in surgery at New York's clinical congress in October 1924, attended by around 2500 surgeons from all over the world. There, the genius of Hunter was immediately recognized, and the youngest professor of anatomy at any important university became one of the most important figures at this great American congress.

Death
In 1924, Hunter travelled to England with the intention he give a course of three lectures to his former colleagues. He finished his first lecture on December 5th; however, he became ill afterwards. Unknowingly enroute to England, Hunter had contracted typhoid fever and died from the illness at University College Hospital on 10 December 1924.

Personal life
Hunter married Hazel Annie McPherson in February 1924. A posthumous son, Irvine John Hunter, was born on 6 September 1925.

Legacy
Portraits by John Longstaff and William Beckwith McInnes were painted after his death; both hang in the Anderson Stuart building of the University of Sydney. Bronze medallions, sculpted by Rayner Hoff, are held at Wesley College, the University and Fort Street High School.

References

Further reading
 Gerald Walsh, (2006) Born of the sun: seven young Australian lives, Canberra: Pandanus, 2006 

1898 births
1924 deaths
Australian academics
Australian anatomists
Australian expatriates in the United Kingdom
People educated at Fort Street High School
People from Bendigo
Sydney Medical School alumni